Girlfriend's Day is a 2017 American comedy-drama film directed by Michael Paul Stephenson and written by Bob Odenkirk, Philip Zlotorynski, and Eric Hoffman. The film stars Odenkirk and Amber Tamblyn and was released on Netflix on February 14, 2017.

Plot
Rival greeting card companies owned by members of the same family operate in a California city and Ray Wentworth works for one.  Previously celebrated for the quality of his romance cards, Ray's divorce leaves him with depression and writer's block, and he is fired.  California's governor declares a new holiday, Girlfriend's Day, which includes a contest to produce the best greeting card to commemorate it.  Ray's former boss believes Ray can recapture his old magic and hires him under the table to create a card good enough to win the contest.  Ray then becomes involved in a tangle of deceit and murder as the rival companies fight to win the contest and the profits and prestige that will come with the victory.

Cast 
 Bob Odenkirk as Raymond "Ray" Wentworth
 Amber Tamblyn as Jill
 Rich Sommer as Buddy
 Toby Huss as Betcher
 David Sullivan as Sonnyboy
 Hannah Nordberg as Liz
 June Diane Raphael as Karen Lamb
 Stacy Keach as Gundy
 Andy Richter as Harold Lamb
 Larry Fessenden as Taft
 Natasha Lyonne as Mrs. Taft
 Alex Karpovsky as Styvesan
 Stephanie Courtney as Cathy Gile
 Echo Kellum as Madsen
 Steven Michael Quezada as Munoz
 David Lynch as Narrator

Production 
On June 4, 2013, it was announced that Bob Odenkirk would write and star as Ray, a greeting cards writer, in the comedy-drama film Girlfriend's Day, which would be directed by Michael Stephenson. Michael and Lindsay Stephenson would produce the film through their Magic Stone Productions along with Odenkirk and Marc Provissiero through their Odenkirk Provissiero Entertainment. On September 17, 2013, Amber Tamblyn joined the film to play a fan of greeting card writers. On November 23, 2015, Netflix acquired global distribution rights for the film, which was also co-written by Philip Zlotorynski and Eric Hoffman, and also produced by M. Elizabeth Hughes.

Principal photography on the film began on November 30, 2015 in Los Angeles.

Release
The film was released worldwide on February 14, 2017.

Critical response
The film received mixed reviews from critics, where the review aggregator website Rotten Tomatoes, the film holds an approval rating of 43% with an average 5.5/10. On February 15, 2017 Paste Magazine gave the film an 8.0 rating (out of 10).

References

External links 
 
  
Bob Odenkirk’s Girlfriend’s Day is an Eerie, Bizarre Noir Comedy by Paste Magazine February 15, 2017
Every Netflix Original Movie, Ranked by New York Magazine January 8, 2019

2017 films
Films directed by Michael Stephenson
American comedy-drama films
2017 comedy-drama films
Films shot in Los Angeles
Films set in California
Holiday-themed films
Films about writers
English-language Netflix original films
2010s English-language films
2010s American films